Charshahi Union is an Union Parishad of Lakshmipur Sadar Upazila of Lakshmipur, Bangladesh. It has an area of 18.80 km2 (7.26 sq mi) and a population of 46873. There are 13 villages in the union: Nurullapur, Charshahi, Choto Bollovpur, East Jafarpur, Rahimpur, East Sahapur, Titarkandi, East Sayedpur, Rampur, Itkhola, Jaliyakandi, Gobindhapur, Jogannathpur.

References
 http://charshahiup.lakshmipur.gov.bd/

Unions of Lakshmipur District